The Governor of Bohol is the local chief executive of the provincial government of Bohol, Philippines.  The governor holds office at the Bohol New Provincial Capitol in Tagbilaran City and its official residence is at the Governor's Mansion located along Carlos P. Garcia Avenue in Cogon District, also in Tagbilaran. Like all local government heads in the Philippines, the governor is elected via popular vote, and may not be elected for a fourth consecutive term (although the former governor may return to office after an interval of one term). In case of death, resignation or incapacity, the vice governor becomes the governor. Along with the governors of Cebu, Negros Oriental, and Siquijor, together with the city mayors of Cebu, Lapu-lapu, and Mandaue, the province's chief executive is a member of the Regional Development Council of the Central Visayas Region.

List of governors of Bohol

References

 
Bohol
Politics of Bohol